Thomas H. "Boston" Corbett (January 29, 1832 – presumed dead  September 1, 1894) was an American Union Army soldier who shot and killed U.S. president Abraham Lincoln's assassin, John Wilkes Booth. Corbett was initially arrested for disobeying orders, but was later released on the orders of Secretary of War Edwin Stanton, who referred to Corbett as "the patriot" upon dismissing him. He was largely considered a hero by the media and the public.

Known for his devout religious beliefs and eccentric behavior, Corbett drifted around the United States before disappearing circa 1888. Circumstantial evidence suggests that he died in the Great Hinckley Fire in Minnesota in September 1894, although no period documentation has yet been found that identifies him positively as a victim of that devastating fire.

Early life and education
Corbett was born in London and immigrated with his family to New York City in 1840. The Corbetts moved frequently before eventually settling in Troy, New York. As a young man, Corbett began apprenticing as a milliner (also called a "hatter"), a profession that he would hold intermittently throughout his life. As a milliner, Corbett was regularly exposed to the fumes of mercury(II) nitrate, then used in the treatment of fur to produce felt used on hats. Excessive exposure to the compound can lead to hallucinations, psychosis and twitching (known as the "hatter's shakes"). Historians have theorized that the mental issues Corbett exhibited before and after the Civil War were caused by this exposure.

Family and religion
After working as a milliner in Troy, Corbett returned to New York City. He later married, but his wife and child died in childbirth. Following their deaths, he moved to Boston. Corbett became despondent over the loss of his wife and began drinking heavily. He was unable to hold a job and eventually became homeless. After a night of heavy drinking, he was confronted by a street preacher whose message persuaded him to join the Methodist Episcopal Church. Corbett immediately stopped drinking and became devoutly religious. After being baptized, he subsequently changed his name to Boston, the name of the city where he was converted. He regularly attended meetings at the Fulton and Bromfield Street churches where his enthusiastic behavior earned him the nickname "The Glory to God man". In an attempt to imitate Jesus, Corbett began to wear his hair very long (he was forced to cut it upon enlisting in the Union Army).

In 1857, Corbett began working at a hat manufacturer's shop on Washington Street in downtown Boston. He was reported to be a proficient milliner, but was known to proselytize frequently and stop work to pray and sing for co-workers who used profanity in his presence. He also began working as a street preacher and would sermonize and distribute religious literature in North Square. Corbett soon earned a reputation around Boston for being a "local eccentric" and religious fanatic. On July 16, 1858, Corbett was propositioned by two prostitutes while walking home from a church meeting. He was deeply disturbed by the encounter. Upon returning to his room at a boardinghouse, Corbett began reading chapters 18 and 19 in the Gospel of Matthew ("And if thy right eye offend thee, pluck it out and cast it from thee....and there be eunuchs, which have made themselves eunuchs for the kingdom of heaven's sake"). In order to avoid sexual temptation and remain holy, he castrated himself with a pair of scissors. He then ate a meal and went to a prayer meeting before seeking medical treatment.

Military career

Enlistment in the Union army

In April 1861, early in the American Civil War, Corbett enlisted as a private in Company I of the 12th Regiment New York Militia. Corbett's eccentric behavior quickly got him into trouble. He carried a Bible with him at all times and read passages aloud from it regularly, held unauthorized prayer meetings and argued with his superior officers. Corbett also condemned officers and superiors for what he perceived as violations of God's word. In one instance, he verbally reprimanded Colonel Daniel Butterfield for using profanity and taking the Lord's name in vain. He was sent to the guardhouse for several days but refused to apologize for his insubordination. Due to his continued disruptive behavior and refusal to take orders, Corbett was court-martialed and sentenced to be shot. His sentence was eventually reduced and he was discharged in August 1863.

Corbett re-enlisted later that month as a private in Company L, 16th New York Cavalry Regiment. On June 24, 1864, he was captured by Confederate Colonel John S. Mosby's men in Culpeper, Virginia, and held prisoner at Andersonville prison for five months. While on the way to Andersonville, the following incident happened, told by a fellow prisoner of Corbett's named William Collins:
 

Corbett was released in an exchange in November 1864 and was admitted to the Army hospital in Annapolis, Maryland, where he was treated for scurvy, malnutrition and exposure. On his return to his company, he was promoted to sergeant. Corbett later testified for the prosecution in the trial of the commandant of Andersonville, Captain Henry Wirz.

Pursuit of John Wilkes Booth
On April 24, 1865, Corbett's regiment was sent to apprehend John Wilkes Booth, the assassin of President Abraham Lincoln, whom Booth fatally shot on April 14, 1865. On April 26, the regiment surrounded Booth and one of his accomplices, David Herold, in a tobacco barn on the Virginia farm of Richard Garrett. Herold surrendered, but Booth refused and cried out, "I will not be taken alive!". The barn was set on fire in an attempt to force him out into the open, but Booth remained inside. Corbett was positioned near a large crack in the barn wall.

Shooting Booth
In an 1878 interview, Corbett claimed that he saw Booth aim his carbine, prompting him to shoot Booth with his Colt revolver despite Secretary of War Edwin Stanton's orders that Booth be captured alive. The bullet struck Booth in the back of the head behind his left ear, passed through his neck, and out into the barn. A low scream of pain like that produced by a sudden throttling came from the assassin, and he pitched headlong to the floor. Corbett and the other soldiers would note a sense of poetic, or cosmic, justice in that Lincoln and Booth were each shot around the same spot of the head. And the damage to Booth was no less severe than that to Lincoln: the bullet had pierced three vertebrae and partially severed his spinal cord, paralyzing him. Their conditions were different as well, as Mary Clemmer Ames summed it up, "The balls entered the skull of each at nearly the same spot, but the trifling difference made an immeasurable difference in the sufferings of the two. Mr. Lincoln was unconscious of all pain, while his assassin suffered as exquisite agony as if he had been broken on a wheel."

Death of Booth
In a weak voice, Booth asked for water and Lt. Colonel Everton Conger and Colonel Lafayette C. Baker gave it to him. A soldier poured water into his mouth, which he immediately spat out, unable to swallow. The bullet wound prevented him from swallowing any of the liquid. Booth asked them to roll him over and turn him facedown. Conger thought it a bad idea. "Then at least turn me on my side," the assassin pleaded. They did, but Conger saw that the move did not relieve Booth's suffering. Baker noticed it, too: "He seemed to suffer extreme pain whenever he was moved...and would several times repeat, 'Kill me.'" At sunrise, Booth remained in agonizing pain. His pulse weakening as his breathing became more labored and irregular. In agony, unable to move his limbs, he asked a soldier to lift his hands before his face and whispered as he gazed at them, "Useless ... Useless." These were his last words. A few minutes later, Booth began gasping for air as his throat continued to swell, then there was a shiver and a gurgle and his body shuddered, before Booth died from asphyxia. He died two hours after Corbett shot him.

Conger initially thought Booth had shot himself. After realizing Booth had been shot by someone else, Conger and Lt. Doherty asked which officer had shot Booth. Corbett stepped forward and admitted he was the shooter. When asked why he had violated orders, Corbett replied, "Providence directed me".

Court-martial
He was immediately arrested and was accompanied by Lt. Doherty to the War Department in Washington, D.C. to be court-martialed. When questioned by Secretary Edwin Stanton about Booth's capture and shooting, both Doherty and Corbett himself agreed that Corbett had, in fact, disobeyed orders not to shoot. However, Corbett maintained that he believed Booth had intended to shoot his way out of the barn and that he acted in self-defense. He told Stanton, "...Booth would have killed me if I had not shot first. I think I did right." Corbett maintained that he didn't intend to kill Booth, but merely wanted to inflict a disabling wound, but either his aim slipped or Booth moved at the moment Corbett pulled the trigger. Stanton paused and then stated, "The rebel is dead. The patriot lives; he has spared the country expense, continued excitement and trouble. Discharge the patriot." Upon leaving the War Department, Corbett was greeted by a cheering crowd. As he made his way to Mathew Brady's studio to have his official portrait taken, the crowd followed him asking for autographs and requesting that he tell them about shooting Booth. Corbett told the crowd:

Contradictions
Eyewitnesses to Booth's shooting contradicted Corbett's version of events and expressed doubts that Corbett was responsible for shooting Booth. Officers who were near Corbett at the time claimed that they never saw him fire his gun (Corbett's gun was never inspected and was eventually lost). They claimed that Corbett came forward only after Lt. Colonel Conger asked who had shot Booth. Richard Garrett, the owner of the farm on which Booth was found, and his 12-year-old son Robert also contradicted Corbett's testimony that he acted in self-defense. Both maintained that Booth had never reached for his gun.

While there was some criticism of Corbett's actions, he was largely considered a hero by the public and press. One newspaper editor declared that Corbett would, "live as one of the World's great avengers." For his part in Booth's capture, Corbett received a portion of the $100,000 reward money, amounting to $1,653.84. His annual salary as a U.S. sergeant was $204. Corbett received offers to purchase the gun he used to shoot Booth. He refused stating, "That is not mine—it belongs to the Government, and I would not sell it for any price."  Corbett also declined an offer for one of Booth's pistols as he did not want a reminder of shooting Booth.

Post-war life
After his discharge from the army in August 1865, Corbett went back to work as a hatter in Boston and frequently attended the Bromfield Street Church. When the hatting business in Boston slowed, Corbett moved to Danbury, Connecticut, to continue his work and also "preached in the country round about." By 1870, he had relocated once again to Camden, New Jersey, where he was known as a "Methodist lay preacher". Corbett's inability to hold a job was attributed to his fanatical behavior; he was routinely fired after continuing his habit of stopping work to pray for his co-workers. In an effort to earn money, Corbett capitalized on his role as "Lincoln's Avenger". He gave lectures about the shooting of Booth accompanied by illustrated lantern slides at Sunday schools, women's groups and tent meetings. Corbett was never asked back due to his increasingly erratic behavior and incoherent speeches.

R.B. Hoover, a man who later befriended Corbett, recalled that Corbett believed "men who were high in authority at Washington at the time of the assassination" were hounding him. Corbett said the men were angry because he had deprived them of prosecuting and executing John Wilkes Booth themselves. He also believed the same men had gotten him fired from various jobs. Corbett's paranoia was furthered by hate mail he received for killing Booth. He became fearful that "Booth's Avengers" or organizations like the "Secret Order" were planning to seek revenge upon him and took to carrying a pistol with him at all times. As his paranoia increased, Corbett began brandishing his pistol at friends or strangers he deemed suspicious.

While attending the Soldiers' Reunion of the Blue and Gray in Caldwell, Ohio, in 1875, Corbett got into an argument with several men over the death of John Wilkes Booth. The men questioned if Booth had really been killed at all which enraged Corbett. He then drew his pistol on the men but was removed from the reunion before he could fire it. In 1878, Corbett moved to Concordia, Kansas, where he acquired a plot of land through homesteading upon which he constructed a dugout home. He continued working as a preacher and attended revival meetings frequently.
In January 1887, Corbett was elected Assistant Doorkeeper in the Kansas House of Representatives where he frequently had run-ins with the public and elected officials, often brandishing his revolver.

Presumed fate
Due to his fame as "Lincoln's Avenger", Corbett was appointed assistant doorkeeper of the Kansas House of Representatives in Topeka in January 1887. On February 15, he became convinced that 
officers of the House were discriminating against him. He jumped to his feet, brandished a revolver and began chasing the officers out of the building. No one was hurt and Corbett was arrested. The following day, a judge declared Corbett insane and sent him to the Topeka Asylum for the Insane. On May 26, 1888, he escaped from the asylum on horseback. He then rode to Neodesha, Kansas, where he briefly stayed with Richard Thatcher, a man he had met while they were prisoners of war. When Corbett left, he told Thatcher he was going to Mexico.

Rather than going to Mexico, Corbett is believed to have settled in a cabin he built in the forests near Hinckley, in Pine County in eastern Minnesota. He is believed to have died in the Great Hinckley Fire on September 1, 1894. Although there is no proof, the name "Thomas Corbett" appears on the list of dead and missing.

Legacy

Imposters
In the years following Corbett's presumed death, several men came forward claiming to be "Lincoln's Avenger". A few years after Corbett was last seen in Neodesha, Kansas, a patent medicine salesman in Enid, Oklahoma, filed an application using Corbett's name to receive pension benefits. After an investigation proved that the man was not Boston Corbett, he was sent to prison. In September 1905, a man arrested in Dallas also claimed to be Corbett. He too was proven to be an imposter and was sent to prison for perjury, and then to the Government Hospital for the Insane.

Memorials
In 1958, Boy Scout Troop 31, of Concordia, Kansas, built a roadside monument to Corbett located on Key Road. A small sign was also placed to mark the dug hole where Corbett had lived for a time.

See also

List of people who disappeared
Jack Ruby

Notes

References

External links

 Boston Corbett: The Man Who Killed John Wilkes Booth
 Photo on Kansas Memory website

1832 births
1880s missing person cases
American Civil War prisoners of war
American escapees
Methodists from Massachusetts
Castrated people
Converts to Methodism
English emigrants to the United States
American milliners
Members of the Methodist Episcopal Church
Methodist evangelists
Military personnel from Troy, New York
Missing person cases in Minnesota
People associated with the assassination of Abraham Lincoln
People declared dead in absentia
People from Boston
People from Camden, New Jersey
People from Concordia, Kansas
People from Hinckley, Minnesota
Military personnel from London
People from Noble County, Ohio
People of New York (state) in the American Civil War
Union Army soldiers
Year of death unknown